Rideau-Jock Ward (Ward 21) is a city ward located in Ottawa, Ontario. Situated in the rural south end of the city, the ward includes rural areas west of the Rideau River and the communities of Manotick, Richmond, North Gower, Munster, Kars, Fallowfield, Ashton and Burritts Rapids as well as the former Goulbourn Township south and west of Stittsville.

History
The ward was created following the area's amalgamation into Ottawa in 2001, and first contested in 2000. Prior to amalgamation, this area was represented on Regional council by Western Townships Ward. Until 2006, the ward was known as Rideau Ward, containing the former Rideau Township. In 2006, the ward increased in size to contain the rural parts of the former Goulbourn Township (excluding Stittsville, which became the new Stittsville Ward), due to population growth in Stittsville. At this time, the ward was re-named Rideau-Goulbourn Ward. In 2014, the new Blackstone subdivision was transferred from Rideau-Goulbourn Ward to Stittsville Ward.

Following the George Floyd protests in 2020, there were calls to re-name this ward due to Goulbourn's namesake, Henry Goulburn's attachment to slavery in the 19th century. The ward name was ultimately changed, with "Goulbourn" being replaced by "Jock", for the Jock River which flows through the former Goulbourn Township.

Regional councillors
Rideau Township formed as an amalgamation of Malborough and North Gower Township in 1974. 
Bill Tupper (1974-1978, Mayor of Rideau)
Dave Bartlett (1978-1985, Mayor of Rideau)
Glenn Brooks (1986-1991, Mayor of Rideau)
James Stewart (1992-1994, Mayor of Rideau)
Betty Hill (1995-2000, Western Townships Ward)

City councillors
Since the amalgamation of Rideau Township into the City of Ottawa, its constituents have elected the following to the Ottawa City Council:

Election results

2000 Ottawa municipal election

2003 Ottawa municipal election

2006 Ottawa municipal election

2010 Ottawa municipal election

2014 Ottawa municipal election

2018 Ottawa municipal election

2022 Ottawa municipal election

|-
! rowspan="2" colspan="2"|Candidate
! colspan="3"|Popular vote
! rowspan="2" colspan="2"|Expenditures
|-
! Votes
! %
! ±%
|-
| style="background-color:#F8EF00;" |
| style="text-align:left;"  | David Brown
| style="text-align:right;" | 6,901
| style="text-align:right;" | 66.64
| style="text-align:right;" | +22.45
| style="text-align:right;" |
|-
| style="background-color:#616B63;" |
| style="text-align:left;"  | Leigh-Andrea Brunet
| style="text-align:right;" | 1,654
| style="text-align:right;" | 15.97
| style="text-align:right;" |
| style="text-align:right;" |
|-
| style="background-color:#2A2829;" |
| style="text-align:left;"  | Kevin Setia
| style="text-align:right;" | 1,201
| style="text-align:right;" | 11.60
| style="text-align:right;" |
| style="text-align:right;" |
|-
| style="background-color:#b0947c;" |
| style="text-align:left;"  | Patty Searl
| style="text-align:right;" | 349
| style="text-align:right;" | 3.37
| style="text-align:right;" |
| style="text-align:right;" |
|-
| style="background-color:#FFFFFF;" |
| style="text-align:left;"  | Michael J. Nowak
| style="text-align:right;" | 251
| style="text-align:right;" | 2.42
| style="text-align:right;" |
| style="text-align:right;" |
|-
| style="text-align:right;background-color:#FFFFFF;" colspan="2" |Total valid votes
| style="text-align:right;background-color:#FFFFFF;" | 10,356
| style="text-align:right;background-color:#FFFFFF;" | 98.03
| style="text-align:right;background-color:#c2c2c2;" colspan="2" |
|-
| style="text-align:right;background-color:#FFFFFF;" colspan="2" |Total rejected, unmarked and declined votes
| style="text-align:right;background-color:#FFFFFF;" | 208
| style="text-align:right;background-color:#FFFFFF;" | 1.97
| style="text-align:right;background-color:#c2c2c2;" colspan="2" |
|-
| style="text-align:right;background-color:#FFFFFF;" colspan="2" |Turnout
| style="text-align:right;background-color:#FFFFFF;" | 10,564
| style="text-align:right;background-color:#FFFFFF;" | 48.09
| style="text-align:right;background-color:#FFFFFF;" | +1.89
| style="text-align:right;background-color:#c2c2c2;" |
|-
| style="text-align:right;background-color:#FFFFFF;" colspan="2" |Eligible voters
| style="text-align:right;background-color:#FFFFFF;" | 21,966
| style="text-align:right;background-color:#c2c2c2;" colspan="3" |
|-
| style="text-align:left;" colspan="6" |Note: Candidate campaign colours are based on the prominent colour used in campaign items (signs, literature, etc.)and are used as a visual differentiation between candidates.
|-
| style="text-align:left;" colspan="13" |Sources:
|}

References

External links
 Map of Rideau-Goulbourn Ward

Ottawa wards
Name changes due to the George Floyd protests